An election to Dinefwr Borough Council was held in May 1983.  It was preceded by the 1979 election and followed by the 1987 election. On the same day there were elections to the other local authorities and community councils in Wales.

Results

Ammanford Town Ward 1 (one seat)

Ammanford Town Ward 2 (one seat)

Ammanford Town Ward 3 (one seat)

Ammanford Town Ward 4 (one seat)

Ammanford Town Ward 5 (one seat)

Betws (one seat)

Brynamman (one seat)

Cilycwm (one seat)

Cwmamman (three seats)

Cwmllynfell (one seat)

Cynwyl Gaeo and Llanwrda (one seat)

Glynamman (one seat)

Llandeilo Fawr North Ward (one seat)

Llandeilo Fawr South Ward (one seat)

Llandeilo Town (two seats)

Llanddeusant / Myddfai (one seat)

Llandovery Town (two seats)

Llandybie and Heolddu (three seats)

Llanegwad and Llanfynydd (one seat)

Llanfihangel Aberbythych and Llangathen (one seat)

Llangadog and Llansadwrn (one seat)

Llansawel and Talley (one seat)

Penygroes (two seats)

Saron (two seats)

References

Dinefwr Borough Council elections
Dinefwr Borough Council election